Cyprus participated in the Eurovision Song Contest 2003 with the song "Feeling Alive" performed by Stelios Constantas.

The Cypriot entry for the 2003 contest in Riga, Latvia was announced on 11 February 2003, having been selected internally by a three-member committee assembled by the country's public broadcasting service Cyprus Broadcasting Corporation (CyBC). To promote the entry, the song was released as a CD single and to radio and television stations within both Cyprus and Greece. Internationally, it was also performed in Malta, Latvia, Poland and Spain in the lead up to the contest.

Cyprus was drawn to compete ninth in the contest, held on 24 May, 2003. At the end of the night, the nation placed 20th in the field of 26 entries, receiving 15 points in total from Greece, Israel, and Malta.

Background

Cyprus' least successful result was in  when it placed last with the song "Tora Zo" by Elpida, receiving only four points in total.

Before Eurovision

Internal selection 
To be considered for the 2003 contest for Cyprus, artists and composers were able to submit their entries to CyBC from 8 to 20 January 2003. Artists of any nationality were able to submit entries, however all composers were required to have Cypriot nationality. At the conclusion of the deadline, over 40 candidate songs were received by CyBC, with some sources reporting as many as 52 songs. On 11 February 2003, the broadcaster announced that the three-member selection committee had internally selected the English-language song "Feeling Alive" performed by Stelios Constantas to represent Cyprus in Riga. "Feeling Alive" was written and composed by Constantas and was initially set to be part of an upcoming album before he decided to submit it for consideration for Eurovision. Constantas had previously attempted to represent Cyprus in the Eurovision Song Contest after taking part in the 1997 and 1999 selection processes. The selection committee consisted of Evi Droutsa (lyricist), Lia Vissi (Cypriot Eurovision representative in 1985) and Marios Skordis (Head of Delegation for Cyprus). In choosing an English-language song, Constantas noted that he thought the judges at the contest would vote more positively if they could understand the song.

Promotion

To promote the entry, a five track CD single was released by V2 Records in Cyprus and Greece on 27 March 2003, and a remixed version of the song was created for release in Italy and Sweden. The song was sent to all major radio stations in the latter two countries and its accompanying music video was put in rotation on Greek music video channel MAD TV. Constantas also promoted the song through several live performances, including at Greece's national final in late February and on Destino a Eurovision, which documented Spain's Eurovision preparation for the year. He later performed at the Mediterranean Party held at a night club in Old Riga in May, singing "Feeling Alive" in both Greek and English. Additional promotional activities took place in Malta and Poland.

At Eurovision
The Eurovision Song Contest 2003 took place at the Skonto Olympic Hall in Riga on 24 May 2003. The draw for running order had previously been held on 29 November 2002 in Riga, with the results being revealed during a delayed broadcast of the proceedings later that day. Cyprus was set to perform ninth, following the entry from Croatia and preceding the entry from Germany. Dress rehearsals for the participants took place beginning on 19 May. A backing vocalist for Cyprus was slightly injured during the first rehearsal, but they were able to continue on schedule. The performance at the contest was introduced by a postcard with Constantas playing football. His stage presence as he sang featured blue tones with the singer and his backing vocalists and dancers wearing all white. For the broadcast, Evi Papamichail provided commentary on RIK 1 television with Pavlos Pavlou on RIK 2 radio.

Voting
Televoting was an obligatory voting method for all participating countries, which awarded 1, 2, 3, 4, 5, 6, 7, 8, 10 and 12 points to their ten favourite songs, in ascending order. Countries voted in the same order as they had performed. At the end of the voting phase, it was determined that Cyprus had been placed 20th in the field of 26 entries, receiving 15 points in total from three nations, including the maximum 12 points from Greece, which they had also given 12 points to through their public televoting. The results of the Cypriot vote were presented by Loukas Hamatsos who served as spokesperson for the nation.

References

Sources
 

2003
Countries in the Eurovision Song Contest 2003
Eurovision